Center for Council, or simply Council, is a Los Angeles-based nonprofit organization that trains practitioners in using council to promote wellness and resiliency and utilizes the practice of council to advance social justice and restorative justice and foster resilient and thriving communities.

Overview
Council is a codified practice, derived from ancient traditions, that involves bringing individuals together in a council circle, under the guidance of a trained facilitator, for a candid and heartfelt conversation. Within the circle, the opportunity to talk is offered one-at-a-time, with the intent to speak from one's personal experience rather than opinion. Participants are encouraged to speak authentically when it's their turn, and to listen deeply, without comment or judgment, while others are speaking. Intention is focused on the common stories, values, fears and aspirations that make one human, encouraging taking the perspective of the other and finding common ground. Council is a compassion-based attentional practice that fosters greater awareness of self and others and capacity for cultivating skillful communication, respectful relationships and ethical action.

Center for Council founder and executive director, Jared Seide described Council practice as follows:

History 
For over 30 years Center for Council existed as a program of The Ojai Foundation. In 2014, Center for Council restructured to become its own independent organization, fiscally sponsored by Community Partners. The organization is an outgrowth of the practices and ideals codified in Jack Zimmerman and Gigi Coyle's book The Way of Council.

Programs
Center for Council offers programs and trainings within the social justice, educational, law enforcement and health care systems, and in partnership with businesses and community based organizations. Its programs are intended to support mindfulness, social and emotional learning and creative problem-solving and the development of skillful communication, cooperation, leadership and compassion. Programs are structured in a "train-the-trainer" format, where participants learn skills to facilitate circles for their peers and community. Programming is built on the premise that sharing stories in a respectful and intentional way leads to healing and community well-being.

Center for Council's "Prison Council Initiative" (formerly the "Inmate Council Program") is a six-month intervention where prisoners are trained to facilitate council sessions for other prisoners. This program has been expanded to 22 California prisons. The Prison Council Initiative was awarded the 2020 "Innovations in Corrections Prize" by the American Correctional Association. Through the Prison Council Initiative, participants learn and teach council-based convening and communication skills to support healthy and productive perspectives and behaviors. The program has been found by corrections staff to help shift culture within the prison and provide inmates with tools for success upon their release.

Following the expansion of Center for Council's work with prison inmates, the California Office of the Inspector General released a special report on High Desert State Prison in December 2015 that recommended implementing a council-based "Wellness and Resiliency Skills Training" program for law enforcement and correctional officers as an antidote to the "entrenched culture" of racism and violence there. The organization created "POWER Training" (Peace Officer Wellness, Empathy & Resilience Training), a mindfulness-oriented council programs for law enforcement officers in Southern California, including the Los Angeles Police Department (LAPD); its programs for officers are certified by the Commission on Peace Officer Standards and Training (C-POST) and focus on skills for improving wellness, interpersonal communication and de-escalation. Graduates of the first cohort of the POWER Training program were featured in a documentary, "Cops & Communities: Circling Up", which also highlighted the work the organization has brought to community activists and formerly incarcerated participants.

Center for Council's "Organizational Wellness Project" (formerly the Social Justice Council Project) provides staff at social justice and social service organizations with training to more effectively engage with constituents and provide services, while also helping foster more cooperative and supportive work environments. Current and past participants include: Homeboy Industries, Anti-Recidivism Coalition, The Actors' Gang, TreePeople, Heart of LA, Brotherhood Crusade, Para Los Niños and many other community based organizations. Additional programs include the "School Community Enhancement Project", the "Trainer Leadership Initiative", and "Compassion, Attunement & Resilience Education (CARE) for Healthcare Professionals".

Research conducted by University of California and RAND Corporation found that Center for Council's programs result in "significant positive outcomes" involving reductions in aggression, anger and hostility, as well as increases in empathy and resilience.

In response to the COVID-19 pandemic, Center for Council began offering online programming, including "Social Connection Councils", for the public, as well as "Essential Worker Councils" and an online learning course called "The Bridge".

References

External links
 

Community-building organizations
Non-profit organizations based in California
Educational organizations based in the United States
Humanist associations